John I de Vaux, also known as Johannem de Vaus, Baron of Dirleton, was a prominent 12th-century Scottish noble.

Life
Vaux was granted the barony of Dirleton, by King David I of Scotland. John built a castle at Eldbotle and another, named Tarbet Castle, on the island of Fidra. John witnessed a number of charters issued by King Malcolm IV of Scotland, including one at Eldbotle. After King William I of Scotland was captured in 1174 at the Battle of Alnwick, John was provided as a hostage for William I at Falaise, Normandy. He was succeeded by his son William.

Citations

References
 
 
 
John de Vaux (fl.c.1160-89) - People of Medieval Scotland

12th-century Scottish people
John I